The Avenging Angel is a 1995 American  Western television film directed by Craig R. Baxley and starring Tom Berenger and James Coburn.

Cast 
 Tom Berenger – Miles Utley
 James Coburn – Porter Rockwell
 Fay Masterson – Miranda Young
 Kevin Tighe – Benjamin Rigby
 Jeffrey Jones – Brother Milton Long
 Tom Bower – Bill Hickman
 Leslie Hope – Liza Rigby
 Daniel Quinn – Alpheus Young
 Andrew Prine – Andrew Pike
 Lisa Banes
 Drew Snyder
 Tracey Ellis
 Charlton Heston – Brigham Young
 Patrick Gorman – Jonathan Parker

Production
Berenger said the religious aspect of the story “is what I thought made it different than other Westerns. Otherwise, it would just be a Western. God knows, we have seen enough of those. I was kind of intrigued. And then Dennis Nemec did the script. It is a killer script—real economical and real right. He cut out a lot of the fat. “

References

External links 
 

1995 television films
1995 films
1995 Western (genre) films
1990s American films
1990s English-language films
American Western (genre) television films
Films directed by Craig R. Baxley
Films scored by Gary Chang
TNT Network original films